Marie Richard Georges Wallace (2 May 1872 – 19 January 1941) was a French fencer. He competed in the individual épée event at the 1900 Summer Olympics. He was the brother of fencer Edmond Wallace.

References

External links
 

1872 births
1941 deaths
French male épée fencers
Olympic fencers of France
Fencers at the 1900 Summer Olympics
Fencers from Paris